Yury Kavalyow (born 27 January 1993) is a Belarusian professional football player who plays as a right midfielder or left midfielder  for Russian club Orenburg.

Club career
On 15 January 2020 he signed a 2.5-year contract with Russian Premier League club FC Arsenal Tula.

International career
Kavalyow made his first appearance for the national team on 10 October 2017, playing the first 65 minutes of the 1:2 loss against France in a 2018 World Cup qualifier.

International goals
Scores and results list Belarus' goal tally first.

Honours
Shakhtyor Soligorsk
Belarusian Cup winner: 2013–14, 2018–19

Personal life
His younger brother Anton Kavalyow is also professional footballer.

Career statistics

References

External links
 
 
 Profile at uefa.com

1993 births
People from Byalynichy District
Sportspeople from Mogilev Region
Living people
Belarusian footballers
Belarus international footballers
Association football midfielders
FC Shakhtyor Soligorsk players
FC Arsenal Tula players
FC Orenburg players
Belarusian Premier League players
Russian Premier League players
Russian First League players
Russian Second League players
Belarusian expatriate footballers
Expatriate footballers in Russia
Belarusian expatriate sportspeople in Russia